4Musics is an Indian music composers group from Kerala consisting of four core members: Jim Jacob, Eldhose Alias, Biby Mathew, and Justin James. The group was founded in 2003. Their debut album, Mazhathulli, was released in 2007. Following the release of their album, they entered the Mollywood film industry as music directors in the movie Juzt Married. The group mainly focuses on folk, melodic, and Indian pop musical styles.

They are also the founders of NHQ (Noise Headquarters) recording studio in Cochin. The band became famous through Oppam, a movie released in 2016. A song in the movie "Minungum Minnaminunge" became popular on social media and YouTube.

Earlier Days 
During 2003 Biby and Jim started doing compositions together. They started off doing Christian devotional songs. Both of them were members of Azhakam St Mary's Jacobite Church choir. Together they did their first devotional Album “Karunardrasneham” in 2003 marked their debut. Soon they joined in a devotional band formed by Sanil Peter, where they met Jimson James (PRESENT MEMBER OF 4 MUSICS) who brought the idea of starting a western Band named (9-1-B-C).

2003- 2007 
Mid-2003 they formed the Band 9-1-B-C with 10 members and thus joined Eldhose Alias and Justin James (brother of Jimson James) to the Band. They started off doing shows in and around Ernakulam, also performed in Kairaly channel in 2004 for the program named “CONFUSION” which marked their first television experience. Later by 2006 the band got Split as Jim and Jimson went to Ireland, Justin went to New Zealand and Eldhose went to Bangalore for their Higher studies. During those days biby was fully active in music by composing music for 2 devotional Albums (SAMARPPANAM, UNNI GANAPATHY) also he joined with Mr. Binoy and Babu Varghese (DAVID's HARP Member) started doing karaoke shows.

2008- 2015 
In 2008 the band reunited and did their First Musical Album named “MAZHATHULLI”. During the time of Mazhathulli band members Jim-Biby-Eldhose- Justin together did the composition of all songs in the album and Lyrics of 8 out of 10 songs was done by Biby and Eldhose. That made them the thought of working together as music composers where these guys realised their outlook towards music and future life in music. Unfortunately, they couldn't release the album which put them in a very difficult situation to move on in music. So they got split again.

After completing Sound engineering and Music technology from the prestigious Windmill Lane Recording Studios/Pulse college from Ireland in 2010, Jim started NHQ studios in Panampilly Nagar Cochin, which marked the turning point in 4 Musics life. They got a chance to perform in Asianet youth club program where the band reunited and done a few own compositions. The program director Jibin and the sound engineer Mr. Sony identified the talent in guys and recommended them to their first movie “JUZT MARRIED” in 2012 directed by Shri Sajan Johny and written by Benny Esthac.  Unfortunately, the movie got released only in 2015. 2012 till 2015 was an extreme struggling stage for the guys where they themselves find very difficult again to move on.

2016- Present 
By the end of 2015, they got the chance to meet Antony Perumbavoor and thus opened the door to OPPAM, Mohanlal as the central character, directed by  Shri Priyadarshan under the big banner AAshirvad Cinemas. The movie got released in 2016 and the songs of the movie went Viral all over the world. 4 Musics won many awards for the songs in Oppam, followed by the hits in  VILLAIN 2017 again with Mohanlal and now in 2019 with 2 super hits “ ITTIMANY MADE IN CHINA” with Mohanlal and BROTHERS DAY with the young superstar/Director Prithviraj Sukumaran.

At the time of Juzt married the Music director given name was “THE FOUR” but during Oppam they changed the name from THE FOUR to “4 MUSICS”. Eldhose was in Saudi Arabia during the time of Oppam and by the End of 2016 he joined back with the team in India, but Justin is still settled in New Zealand and the 4 Musics music journey continues.

Discography

Other Ventures

NHQ 
Noise Headquarters is the seedbed of 4 MUSICS. NHQ is one of the best-equipped recording studios in South India. Part of an internationally affiliated institute for sound engineering, this state-of-the-art studio is located in the heart of Kochi city. Owned by Jim Jacob, one of the pillars of 4 MUSICS, this studio has been recognized by singers, music directors, producers and movie directors as a top-notch facility in Kerala for the fast-growing music industry. Renowned for its fast, custom-designed top-quality production, Truly, a gem in Kochi.

STUDIO 6/8 
The studio owned completely by 4 Musics. Situated in Girinagar, cochin, one of the best facilities for sound recording and music production. 4 Musics personal space where all the pre-production and major Recordings and Production of 4 Musics happens here. A true creative Space.

DAVID’S HARP 
Devotional music is perhaps the most flourishing musical stream in many parts of the world, especially India, where one's life and his faith are inseparably entwined. 4 MUSICS has a special department for this genre – David's Harp. Just like the famous King David's legendary Harp, it is revolutionising the concept and percept of devotional albums. David's Harp aims at reimagining the tastes of our devotional listeners by offering cutting-edge quality music that relaxes their bodies and soothes their minds.

David’s Harp Members 

 Babu Varghese ( Vocalist, Composer, Lyricist )
 Biby Mathew ( Vocalist, Composer, Lyricist )
 Eldhose Alias ( Vocalist, Composer, Lyricist )
 Jim Jacob ( Vocalist, Composer)

David’s Harp Works 

https://www.youtube.com/watch?v=aOlmh03B1YI
https://www.youtube.com/watch?v=oBLVlnlDCac&t=1071s
https://www.youtube.com/watch?v=X4bNZs9kFec
https://www.youtube.com/watch?v=2SvVg2FzHB8&t=191s
https://www.youtube.com/watch?v=fIh5el7ICJk
https://www.youtube.com/watch?v=cab2-EelR0c

Music Mug 

Music Mug is a creative platform and a path breaking initiative introduced by 4 Musics to
showcase the talented singers worldwide. Can be count as a single window channel to the world
of Indian film and music industry. In Music Mug the selected singers get the opportunity to work
with 4 Musics by singing their original compositions. The song will be filmed along with featuring
the singer. Both audio and the video of the song will be released in most of the digital media
platforms throughout the world.

Awards 

Asianet film awards 2016 Best Music director
Mangalam Music Awards 2017 Popular music director
Indywood excellence Award for the upcoming Music director 2017
Kerala Film Critics Association Award 2017 for the Best Music Director
Mangalam Music Awards 2018 Best Music Director

References 

Indian pop music groups
Singers from Kochi